= Nicola Dolapchieff =

- Born: 7 February 1897; Sliven, Kingdom of Bulgaria
- Died: 8 November 1964 (aged 67); Los Angeles, California, United States
- Resting place: Forest Lawn Memorial Park (Hollywood Hills)
- Education: Sofia University

Nicola Dolapchieff (Bulgarian: Никола Долапчиев) was a Bulgarian-American lawyer and professor of criminal law.

== Biography ==
Dolapchieff was born on February 7, 1897, in the Sliven city (Bulgaria). He was the dean of the Law School and Professor of Criminal Law at the University of Sofia, Bulgaria, and editor of the journal, Jridicheska Measul, (Juridical Thought), published by the Ministry of Justice.

In 1957, Dolapchieff went aboard the Queen Mary from Liverpool to New York City with his wife Rada and his son George. He settled with his family in Los Angeles, California. Deprived of Bulgarian citizenship, he applied for and received US citizenship. He died on November 8, 1964, and was buried in the cemetery Forest Lawn Memorial Park (Hollywood Hills) in Los Angeles.

== Bibliography ==
- The civil action before the criminal court, (Sophia, 1921)
- Die logishe Aufbau des Schuldbegriffs irri Strafrechtssystem (Berlin, 1924)
- Illegality and Culpability (Sofia, 1925) (44 Penal Law in Soviet Russia (1926)
- The Crime, Act and Causation (1927)
- Handbook of Bulgarian Criminal Law (1931)
